Richmond upon Thames London Borough Council elections are held every four years for all 54 councillor seats in the 18 wards that make up  the Borough Council. By-elections are held in individual wards when vacancies arise outside the four-year cycle.

Political control
The first election to the council was held in 1964, initially operating as a shadow authority before the new system came into full effect in 1965. Political control of the council since 1964 has been held by the following parties:

Leadership
The leaders of the council since 1965 have been:

Council elections
 1964 Richmond upon Thames London Borough Council election
 1968 Richmond upon Thames London Borough Council election (boundary changes took place but the number of seats remained the same)
 1971 Richmond upon Thames London Borough Council election (boundary changes took place but the number of seats remained the same)
 1974 Richmond upon Thames London Borough Council election
 1978 Richmond upon Thames London Borough Council election (boundary changes reduced the number of seats by two)
 1982 Richmond upon Thames London Borough Council election
 1986 Richmond upon Thames London Borough Council election
 1990 Richmond upon Thames London Borough Council election
 1994 Richmond upon Thames London Borough Council election (boundary changes took place but the number of seats remained the same)
 1998 Richmond upon Thames London Borough Council election (boundary changes took place but the number of seats remained the same)
 2002 Richmond upon Thames London Borough Council election (boundary changes increased the number of seats by two) 
 2006 Richmond upon Thames London Borough Council election
 2010 Richmond upon Thames London Borough Council election
 2014 Richmond upon Thames London Borough Council election
 2018 Richmond upon Thames London Borough Council election
 2022 Richmond upon Thames London Borough Council election

Borough result maps

By-election results

1964–1968
There were no by-elections.

1968–1971

1971–1974

1974–1978

Following the discovery of a series of voting errors, the High Court on 5 August 1976 declared the Liberal candidate in place of the Conservative. The revised votes are recorded here.

1978–1982

1982–1986

1986–1990

1990–1994

The by-election was called following the resignation of Cllr. Anthony T. Johnson.

The by-election was called following the death of Cllr. Gavin Alexander.

1994–1998

The by-election was called following the resignation of Cllr. Elaine I. Pippard.

The by-election was called following the resignation of Cllr. Philip A. Northey.

The by-election was called following the resignation of Cllr. Susan E. Fenwick.

The by-election was called following the resignation of Cllr. David A. R. Martin.

1998–2002

The by-election was called following the resignation of Cllr. Helen Blake.

2002–2006

The by-election was called following the death of Cllr. John L. Saunders.

The by-election was called following the death of Cllr. Anthony J. Barnett.

The by-election was called following the death of Cllr. Jean M. Matthews.

The by-election was called following the resignation of Cllr. Marc L. Cranfield-Adams.

The by-election was called following the death of Cllr. Derek Beattie.

2006–2010

The by-election was called following the resignation of Cllr. Benedict A. Stanberry.

2010–2014

The by-election was called following the resignation of Cllr. Richard J. Montague.

2014–2018

The by-election was called following the resignation of Cllr. Tania Mathias, of the Conservative Party, following her election as the Member of Parliament for Twickenham.

2018–2022

The by-election was called following the death of Cllr. Mona Adams.

Hampton Wick

The by-election was held following the resignation of Councillor Dylan Baxendale.

Notes

References

External links
Richmond upon Thames Council: Local Council election results